Stephen R. Marquardt is an American surgeon born and raised in Southern California.  He received his medical degree from UCLA and completed his residency on Oral and Maxillofacial surgery at the UCLA Medical Center.  His university appointments have included Assistant Research Oral Surgeon and Chief of Facial Imaging at UCLA, and professorships at Loma Linda University as well as the University of Southern California.

He retired from active surgical practice after 27 years and currently conducts his research on human attractiveness in Orange County, California.  Marquardt is an active member of the Societies of Maxillofacial Surgeons.

He is known for the "Marquardt face mask” or “repose frontal mask”, a drawing which is said to represent the proportions of an ideal human face and which makes use of the golden ratio.

See also
Physical attractiveness

References

External links
Beauty Analysis web site

Year of birth missing (living people)
Living people
David Geffen School of Medicine at UCLA alumni
Loma Linda University faculty
University of Southern California faculty
American maxillofacial surgeons